In Ancient Roman and Byzantine tradition, acclamatio (Koiné  aktologia) was the public expression of approbation or disapprobation, pleasure or displeasure, etc., by loud acclamations.

These , which are frequently quoted by the Scriptores Historiae Augustae, were often of considerable length, and seem to have been chanted by the whole body of senators.

See also 

 Constantine VII
 De Ceremoniis

References

External links 

Society of ancient Rome
Genres of Byzantine music